Grants Pass is the county seat of Josephine County, Oregon, United States. The city is located on Interstate 5, northwest of Medford, along the Rogue River.  The population was 39,189 at the 2020 census.

History
Early Hudson's Bay Company hunters and trappers, following the Siskiyou Trail, passed through the site beginning in the 1820s. In the late 1840s, settlers (mostly American) following the Applegate Trail began traveling through the area on their way to the Willamette Valley. The city states that the name was selected to honor General Ulysses S. Grant's success at Vicksburg.  The Grants Pass post office was established on March 22, 1865. The city of Grants Pass was incorporated in 1887.

The Oregon–Utah Sugar Company, financed by Charles W. Nibley, was created, leading to a sugar beet factory being built in Grants Pass in 1916. Before the factory opened, Oregon-Utah Sugar was merged into the Utah-Idaho Sugar Company. Due to labor shortages and low acreage planted in sugar beets, the processing machinery was moved to Toppenish, Washington, in 1918 or 1919.

Grants Pass, along with Medford and Ashland was an unofficial "sundown town", which actively warned Black and other non-white people to leave town before sunset or face violence and harassment. Although there was no documented law of the racist policy, it was enforced locally via residents and signage.

Geography
Grants Pass is located in the Rogue Valley; the Rogue River runs through the city. U.S. Route 199 passes through the city, and joins Interstate 5.

Climate

True to its motto, "It's the climate!", Grants Pass has a USDA plant hardiness zone 8b climate.  According to the Köppen climate classification system, Grants Pass has a hot-summer Mediterranean climate (Csa).

Grants Pass receives roughly  precipitation per year, with three-quarters of it occurring between November 1 and March 31. The mild winters and dry summers support a native vegetation structure quite different from the rest of Oregon, dominated by madrone, deciduous and evergreen oak, manzanita, pine, bush chinquapin, and other species that are far less abundant further north.

Measurable precipitation falls on an average of 110 days annually. There is an average of only  of snow annually.

Demographics

2010 census
As of the census of 2010,  there were 34,533 people, 14,313 households, and 8,700 families residing in the city. The racial makeup of the city was 90.9% White, 1.2% Native American, 1.1% Asian,  0.5% African American, 0.3% Pacific Islander, 2.3% from other races, and 3.7% from two or more races. Hispanic or Latino of any race were 8.5% of the population.

There were 14,313 households, of which 30.7% had children under the age of 18 living with them, 41.3% were married couples living together, 14.5% had a female householder with no husband present, 4.9% had a male householder with no wife present, and 39.2% were non-families. 32.8% of all households were made up of individuals, and 16.3% had someone living alone who was 65 years of age or older. The average household size was 2.34 and the average family size was 2.94.

The median age in the city was 39.3 years. 24.3% of residents were under the age of 18; 8.4% were between the ages of 18 and 24; 23.6% were from 25 to 44; 25% were from 45 to 64; and 18.6% were 65 years of age or older. The gender makeup of the city was 47.3% male and 52.7% female.

2000 census
As of the census of 2000, there were 23,003 people, 9,376 households, and 5,925 families residing in the city. The population density was 3,033 per square mile (7,855/km2). There were 9,885 housing units at an average density of 1,303.3 per square mile (503.5/km2).  By 2008, the city's population had increased to 33,239. According to U.S. Census figures from the 2006-2008 American Community Survey, the racial composition of the city's population was 93.6% white, 0.2% black, 1.6% American Indian, 1.1% Asian, 1.2% other race, and 2.3% two or more races.  Hispanics or Latinos, who may be of any race, formed 7.2% of the city's population.

There were 9,376 households, out of which 31.1% had children under the age of 18 living with them, 44.5% were married couples living together, 14.5% had a female householder with no husband present, and 36.8% were non-families. 31.2% of all households were made up of individuals, and 16.0% had someone living alone who was 65 years of age or older. The average household size was 2.36 and the average family size was 2.94.

In the city, the population was spread out, with 26.0% under the age of 18, 8.1% from 18 to 24, 25.7% from 25 to 44, 20.7% from 45 to 64, and 19.4% who were 65 years of age or older. The median age was 38 years. For every 100 females, there were 86.8 males. For every 100 females age 18 and over, there were 80.7 males.

The median income for a household in the city was $29,197, and the median income for a family was $36,284. Males had a median income of $31,128 versus $23,579 for females. The per capita income for the city was $16,234. About 12.2% of families and 34.9% of the population were below the poverty line, including 20.8% of those under age 18 and 7.3% of those age 65 or over.

Government and politics
The city council has 8 members as of 2019, representing 4 wards and are elected to 4 year terms by the city. The city council and mayor are not paid, and they volunteer their time. The council oversees the city government and chooses the city manager. The Mayor's job is to provide leadership and preside over city council meetings. The Mayor can also issue vetoes and make a tiebreaker vote. 
Grants Pass is conservative leaning and represented in the United States House of Representatives by Congressman Cliff Bentz (R-Ontario). At the state level of politics, Grants Pass is represented in the Oregon Senate by Art Robinson (R-Cave Junction) who holds Oregon's 2nd Senate district, and represented in the Oregon House of Representatives by Lily Morgan (R-Grants Pass) holding Oregon's 3rd House district and Duane Stark (R-Grants Pass) holding Oregon's 4th House district.

Economy
The lumber industry was the major employer for Grants Pass up until the early 1970s.  At that point the entire region started to see a steady decline in all lumber harvesting, production, and processing.  Since then there has been a shift to a large service industry sector covering areas of outdoors/sports/recreation and health care infrastructure.  This is augmented by multiple small and medium businesses and growth in marijuana-related businesses due to state legalization.

Notable businesses 
Grants Pass is the birthplace of Dutch Bros. Coffee, which began with a single small pushcart on the corner of 6th and G Streets, where the downtown stand is now located. Brothers Travis and Dane Boersma started the franchise in 1992 and it quickly spread throughout the region.

Fire Mountain Gems has been operating in Josephine county since 1986 and moved to Grants Pass in 2000.  They are a well-known direct marketing company, providing jewelry-making supplies to designer-artists around the world.

MasterBrand, a subsidiary of Fortune Brands, is a cabinet company which has an operating factory in Grants Pass.

Arts and culture

Annual cultural events
Boatnik, a hydroplane boat race and carnival event, is held every Memorial Day weekend in Riverside Park.

They also host the Josephine County Fair which usually occurs in late August.

Museums and other points of interest
The historic Rogue Theatre downtown has been transformed into a performing arts venue that hosts mostly local acts. The Grants Pass Towne Center Association's "Back to the '50s" Celebration includes free concerts, a nearly 600-vehicle Classic Car Cruise, poker runs, and thematic shopping in the town's downtown historic district.

Year round, there are First Friday Art Nights. On the first Friday of every month, many of the city's downtown stores hold art shows and promotional events.

The Grants Pass post office contains two tempera murals done through the U.S. Treasury Department Section on Fine Arts (often mistakenly referred to as the "WPA"), both painted in 1938. There are ten government-sponsored New Deal era murals in Oregon; Grants Pass is the only post office that contains two. The murals are "Rogue River Indians" by Louis DeMott Bunce (who also painted a 1959 mural at Portland International Airport) and "Early and Contemporary Industries" by Eric Lamade.

The Caveman Bridge on 6th Street was built by Conde McCullough in 1933. The through arch design bridge has been a landmark of Grants Pass for many years, and the bridge was refurbished in 2019. The Redwood Empire sign at the beginning of the bridge has also been a landmark for many years, and it was redone in 2021 due to a car crash.

Parks and recreation
Grants Pass has numerous and diverse parks and green spaces. Notable city-run parks include Riverside Park, summer home to the local Concerts in the Park series, and the Reinhart Volunteer Park, a park largely built through the efforts of community volunteers and featuring facilities for many sports. Grants Pass is a Tree City USA Community and has been for 35 years.

Education
Grants Pass area public schools are served by Grants Pass School District, including Grants Pass High School, and Three Rivers School District, including Illinois Valley High School, North Valley High School, Rivers Edge Academy Charter School, and Hidden Valley High School. Rogue Community College's (RCC) main (Redwood Campus) is located south of Grants Pass on Redwood Highway with additional campuses located in Medford, Oregon (Riverside Campus) and White City (Table Rock Campus).

Law enforcement
The City of Grants Pass is served by individual departments, each with their own respective buildings. The city has a Department of Public Safety as well.

Media

Newspapers
The Grants Pass Daily Courier is the region's newspaper. The newspaper was established in 1885 with the name "Grant's Pass Courier" and then "Rogue River Courier." After the newspaper became a daily, the name was changed to what it is today. The other paper of record in Josephine County is the Illinois Valley News in Cave Junction established in 1937.

Radio
AM
KAGI 930 JPR — News and Information
KAJO 1270 — Classic Hits/News/Talk

FM
(Medford and Ashland stations listed by Grants Pass translator frequencies)
KDOV 88.1  Religious
KLXG  91.1  K-LOVE — Religious
KTMT-FM 92.1  Top 40
KIFS 93.1  Top 40
KRRM 94.7  Traditional Country
KBOY-FM 96.1  Classic Rock
KROG 96.9  The Rogue — Active Rock
KLDR 98.3  Top 40
KISS   98.5  KISS FM: Modern Pop Hits
KRWQ 98.7  Country
KCMD 99.3  News/Talk
KLDZ 100.7  Classic Hits
KSOR 101.5  JPR Classical
KCNA 102.7  The Drive — Classic Hits
KAWZ 103.1  CSN — Religious
KAKT 104.7  Country
KMED 106.3  News/Talk
KGPZ-LP 106.7  Christian
KCMX-FM 107.1  Adult Contemporary
KJCR-LP 107.9  Catholic Talk

Transportation

Road
Interstate 5
U.S. Route 199
Oregon Route 99
Oregon Route 238

Bus
Greyhound Lines

Rail
Central Oregon and Pacific Railroad

Air
Rogue Valley International–Medford Airport
Grants Pass Airport

Notable people

 David Anders, actor
 Catherine Anderson, writer of historical and contemporary romance novels
 Agnes Baker Pilgrim, chairperson, International Council of Thirteen Indigenous Grandmothers
 Carl Barks, writer and artist
 Ty Burrell, actor
 Terry Carr,  science fiction fan, author, editor, and writing instructor
 Kit Culkin, actor
 Michael Curry, puppet designer
 Brandon Drury, baseball player with the San Diego Padres
 David Goines, artist, writer
 Helen Chenoweth-Hage, U.S. Representative from Idaho
 Kevin Hagen, actor
 Jack Lee Harelson, archaeological looter
 Mike Johnson (bassist), musician, singer-songwriter
 Debbie Lawler, stunt performer 
 Charles Levin, actor
 Jim McDonald, baseball player
 Gary McFarland, composer, arranger, vibraphonist and vocalist
 Merrill McPeak, former Chief of Staff of the United States Air Force
 Russell Myers, cartoonist, creator of the comic strip Broom-Hilda
 Scott O'Hara, pornographic actor and poet
 Hub Pernoll, baseball player
 Michael Saucedo, actor, musician
 Josh Saunders, soccer player (goalkeeper)
 Shelley Shannon, anti-abortion activist, convicted arsonist and attempted murderer
 Cornelius Sidler, Wisconsin State Assemblyman and lawyer
 Ken Williams, baseball player

National Football League (NFL) players
 Pat Beach
 Tom Blanchard
 Dick James
 Jerry Sherk
 Don Summers
 Al Wistert

Sister city
 Rubtsovsk, Altai Krai, Russia

See also
 Southern Oregon
 Rogue River – Siskiyou National Forest
 Jefferson (proposed Pacific state), proposed state overlapping Oregon and California

References

External links

Entry for Grants Pass in the Oregon Blue Book

 
Cities in Oregon
County seats in Oregon
Cities in Josephine County, Oregon
Populated places established in 1865
Micropolitan areas of Oregon
1865 establishments in Oregon
Sundown towns in Oregon